Omphalocera occidentalis is a species of snout moth in the genus Omphalocera. It was described by William Barnes and Foster Hendrickson Benjamin in 1924 and is known from the US states of Nevada, Arizona and New Mexico.

The wingspan is about 42 mm for females and 34 mm for males.

References

Moths described in 1924
Megarthridiini